The Idol's Eye (also Idols Eye) is a 70.21-carat Golconda diamond. It has a very light blue colour with nine main facets and was found in 1600 in the Golconda Sultanate in southern India. According to legend, the diamond was initially owned by Prince Rahab of Persia, who sold it to his creditors. The diamond re-appeared on 14 July 1865, when it was introduced by Christie's for auction in London, where it was purchased by Ottoman sultan Abdul Hamid II. After the Turkish Nationalist revolution, the Ottoman Sultanate was abolished and Abdul Hamid II was exiled to Paris. Along with other belongings, he carried a consignment of imperial jewels, but one of his servants betrayed and sold them in Paris on 24 July 1909, after which it was purchased by a Spanish aristocrat. Following World War II, it was sold to the American jeweller Harry Winston, and later purchased by the American philanthropist May Bonfils Stanton. After her death in 1962, it was purchased by the Chicago jewelry store owner Harry Levinson at auction.

References

Further reading
 The Idol's Eye

Golconda diamonds